Lin Wusun (1928 to January 27, 2021) is a Chinese translator. He was the President of China International Publishing Group between 1988 and 1993, the Executive Vice-President of the Translators Association of China between 1992 and 2004, the Chief-Editor of Chinese Translators Journal between 2002 and 2005.

Biography
Lin was born in 1928 in Tianjin, he studied English in Tianjin, Shanghai, and Calcutta.

In 1946, Lin went to study in America.

In 1950, Lin returned to China, he served as the president of China International Publishing Group between 1988 and 1993, he became the executive vice-president of the Translators Association of China between 1992 and 2004, In 1992, he was appointed as the chief editor of Chinese Translators Journal. He died on January 27, 2021.

Translations
 The Art of War (Sun Tzu)
 Sun Bin's Art of War (Sun Bin)
 Analects (Confucius)
 Nanking Massacre
 Tibetan
 Precious Historical Treasures of the Potala Palace
 Silk Road

Awards
Lin was awarded the Lifetime Achievement Award in Translation in 2011.

References

1928 births
Writers from Tianjin
People's Republic of China translators
Chinese–English translators
English–Chinese translators
Living people
20th-century Chinese translators
21st-century Chinese translators
Chinese expatriates in India
Chinese expatriates in the United States